T. Nadarajah (born c. 1919) was a Malayan field hockey Goalkeeper. He competed in the men's tournament at the Melbourne1956 Summer Olympics.

References

External links
 

Year of birth uncertain
Possibly living people
Malaysian people of Tamil descent
Malaysian sportspeople of Indian descent
Malaysian male field hockey players
Olympic field hockey players of Malaya
Field hockey players at the 1956 Summer Olympics
Sportspeople from Kuala Lumpur